In computational geometry, the multiple line segment intersection problem supplies a list of line segments in the Euclidean plane and asks whether any two of them intersect (cross).

Simple algorithms examine each pair of segments. However, if a large number of possibly intersecting segments are to be checked, this becomes increasingly inefficient since most pairs of segments are not close to one another in a typical input sequence.  The most common, and more efficient, way to solve this problem for a high number of segments is to use a sweep line algorithm, where we imagine a line sliding across the line segments and we track which line segments it intersects at each point in time using a dynamic data structure based on binary search trees. The Shamos–Hoey algorithm applies this principle to solve the line segment intersection detection problem, as stated above, of determining whether or not a set of line segments has an intersection; the Bentley–Ottmann algorithm works by the same principle to list all intersections in logarithmic time per intersection.

See also 
 Bentley–Ottmann algorithm

References

Further reading 
  Chapter 2: Line Segment Intersection, pp. 19–44.
 Thomas H. Cormen, Charles E. Leiserson, Ronald L. Rivest, and Clifford Stein. Introduction to Algorithms, Second Edition. MIT Press and McGraw-Hill, 1990. . Section 33.2: Determining whether any pair of segments intersects, pp. 934–947.
 J. L. Bentley and T. Ottmann., Algorithms for reporting and counting geometric intersections, IEEE Trans. Comput. C28 (1979), 643–647.

External links 
 Intersections of Lines and Planes Algorithms and sample code by Dan Sunday
 Robert Pless. Lecture 4 notes. Washington University in St. Louis, CS 506: Computational Geometry (cached copy).
 Line segment intersection in CGAL, the Computational Geometry Algorithms Library
 "Line Segment Intersection" lecture notes by Jeff Erickson.
 Line-Line Intersection Method With C Code Sample Darel Rex Finley

Geometric algorithms
Geometric intersection
Computational geometry